"Take It Easy!" is the title of the eighth single by the Hello! Project unit Buono!. The title song is the fourth song used for the ending theme of Shugo Chara!! Doki—.

The single was released on August 26, 2009 in Japan under the Pony Canyon label in two different versions: regular and limited.

The Single V version was released on September 2, 2009

Track listing

CD 
 "Take It Easy!"
 
 "Take It Easy! (Instrumental)"
 "Kirai Suki Dai Kirai (Instrumental)"

Single V DVD 
 "Take It Easy! <Music Clip>"
 "Take It Easy! <Close Up Version>"
 "Take It Easy! <Dance Shot Version>"

References

External links 
 "Take it Easy!" entries on the Hello! Project official website: CD 

2009 singles
Shugo Chara!
Buono! songs
Song recordings produced by Tsunku
2009 songs
Pony Canyon singles
Song articles with missing songwriters